Biddulph Grange is a National Trust landscaped garden, in Biddulph near Stoke-on-Trent, Staffordshire, England. It is separate from Biddulph Grange Country Park.

Description
"Behind a gloomy Victorian shrubbery there's a gloomy Victorian mansion, but behind that lurks one of the most extraordinary gardens in Britain...it contains whole continents, including China and Ancient Egypt – not to mention Italian terraces and a Scottish glen."

The "rhododendrons and azaleas are spectacular in late spring, but the pinetum and the evergreen topiary provide year-round interest. It's a fantastic garden for children, with its tunnels and rockeries, and there is a children's quiz trail."

The true brilliance of Biddulph Grange "lies in the way that Cooke and Bateman hid the different areas of the garden from each other, using heaps of rocks and thickly planted shrubberies' the design locks together as tightly as a jigsaw or a cross-section of the brain." It contains "a series of Italianate terraces, connected by steps and enclosing small flower gardens' at the bottom, long, buttressed hedges enclose a dahlia walk," In the Egyptian part of the garden, "Two sphinxes guard the mastaba-like entrance to a tunnel, whose darkness is an invitation to explore. Deep inside is a bloody chamber (lit by a hidden window of red-coloured glass) in which squats the half-spooky, half-comic figure of the Ape of Thoth."

Garden features

The garden is divided into many different areas with themes including:
Chinese garden
Egyptian garden
Western Terrace
Italian Garden
Lime Avenue
Rhododendron Ground
The Glen
Pinetum and Arboretum
Bowling green and Quoit Ground
Cheshire Cottage
Wellingtonia Avenue
The Stumpery
Dahlia Walk
Lower, Rose, Verbena and Araucaria Parterres
Cherry Orchard

History

Biddulph Grange was developed by James Bateman (1811–1897), the accomplished horticulturist and landowner; he inherited money from his father, who had become rich from coal and steel businesses. He moved to Biddulph Grange around 1840, from nearby Knypersley Hall. He created the gardens with the aid of his friend and painter of seascapes Edward William Cooke. The gardens were meant to display specimens from Bateman's extensive and wide-ranging collection of plants.

Biddulph Grange "started life as a bog-standard rectory, but around 1840 it was bought by James Bateman...he and his wife Maria had a passion for plants and the money to indulge their interests, and as the house was enlarged they began work on the surrounding gardens. In this they were helped by an artist friend, Edward William Cooke, who was not just a keen designer but whose father-in-law owned one of the biggest plant nurseries of the day, Loddiges of Hackney." The gardens "were designed by James and Maria Bateman. Bateman...bought specimens brought back by the great Victorian plant-hunters and became an expert on orchids."

Bateman was president of the North Staffordshire Field Society, and served on the Royal Horticultural Society's Plant Exploration Committee. The gardens "were meant to display specimens from Bateman's extensive and wide-ranging collection of plants." He especially loved Rhododendrons and Azaleas. Bateman was "a collector and scholar on orchids," He had a number of notable sons who grew up at Biddulph Grange, including the painter Robert Bateman.

His gardens are a rare survival of the interim period between the Capability Brown landscape garden and the High Victorian style. The gardens are compartmentalised and divided into themes: Egypt, China, etc.

In 1861 Bateman and his sons, who had used up their savings, gave up the house and gardens, and Bateman moved to Kensington in London. Robert Heath bought Biddulph Grange in 1871. After the house burnt down in 1896, architect Thomas Bower rebuilt it.

The post-1896 house served as a children's hospital from 1923 until the 1960s; known first as the "North Staffordshire Cripples' Hospital" and later as the "Biddulph Grange Orthopaedic Hospital" (though it took patients with non-orthopaedic conditions as well. Under this latter title the hospital's role expanded to accommodate adults, continuing in operation into the mid-1980s.) The   garden became badly run-down and neglected during this period, and the deeply dug-out terraced area near the house around Dahlia Walk was filled in level to make a big lawn for patients to be wheeled out on in summertime. The Bateman property was (and still is) divided: the hospital got the house and its gardens, and the uncultivated remainder of Biddulph Grange's land became the Biddulph Grange Country Park.

Until 1991 the house and gardens "housed an orthopaedic hospital, whose managers (understandably enough) were more concerned with their patients than the weird stuff looming out of rocky outcrops in the grounds. For the best part of a century the gardens decayed, visited only by passing vandals and, more rarely, intrepid folly-hunters."

Restoration

In 1988 the National Trust took ownership of the property and its gardens, which have now been nearly fully restored, including a long work digging out the Dahlia Walk area archaeology-style to find forgotten features. In 1995–96 the Wellingtonia Walk, which had become post-mature and badly gappy, was clear felled and in that year and the next replanted.

, the last bit being restored is the Woodland Terrace, whose site a few years ago was at last rid of a hospital ward building and is still intruded on by houses. The feature known as the Great Wall of China has been rebuilt to cure the effects of long-term subsidence; the work was finished in the winter of 2010–11. A meandering walk route called the Woodland Walk was laid out in time for the 2011 season, in the woods to the left side of the Wellingtonia Walk (looking outward). In 2011 they started planting bulbs and early-summer bedding in Dahlia Walk to cover before the dahlias come into flower.

Images

See also
 Listed buildings in Biddulph
 Edward William Cooke
 European Garden Heritage Network

References

Further reading
 Hayden, Peter (1989), Biddulph Grange, Staffordshire: a Victorian Garden Rediscovered, National Trust,

External links

 Biddulph Grange information at the National Trust
 Biddulph Grange Tunnels
 Panoramas of Biddulph Grange
 Biddulph Grange Gardens May 2006 - The Complete Tour
 Biddulph Grange Gardens
 Biddulph Grange BBC site
 Picture of Biddulph Grange 1902

Grade I listed parks and gardens in Staffordshire
Country houses in Staffordshire
Italianate architecture in England
National Trust properties in Staffordshire
Grade II* listed buildings in Staffordshire
Tourist attractions of the Peak District
Biddulph